Movement for the Intellectually Disabled of Singapore (MINDS) is a voluntary welfare organisation based in Singapore, that provides services for the intellectually disabled. MINDS was founded in 1962, and remains one of the largest charities in Singapore. Over 600 staff and 2,400 beneficiaries are a part of MINDS.  Two other organisations, the Association for Persons with Special Needs and Metta School were formed as an offshoot of MINDS.

History
In 1960, the Singapore Children's Society initiated several educational and training programmes for intellectually disabled children, leading to the formation of the Singapore Association for Retarded Children (SARC) in 1962. Medical social worker Daisy Vaithilingam was involved in the creation of the group. Along with Vaithliningam, other participants in the creation of MINDS were Warren Fox, Ena Aeria, and Freda Paul. After running the pilot project with the go-ahead of the Singapore Children's Society, they applied for funding from the Rotary Club and received a grant of $10,000.

Beginning with only two teachers and 26 students in a single classroom in Towner Road, the new association rapidly expanded over the 1960s, building special schools at Margaret Drive and Jurong, a sheltered workshop at Geylang, a residential home at Tampines as well as their main administration centre, Lee Kong Chian Centre. SARC started a subcommittee for services for those with less severe intellectual disabilities in 1971 and a youth volunteering group the year after; the subcommittee was split into an independent organisation, the Association for the Educationally Subnormal (AESN), in 1976. In 1983 SARC launched the first early intervention programme in Singapore, prompting other organisations to follow suit and set up an adjunct subcommittee that became Special Olympics Singapore.

Since the term "retarded" had acquired negative connotations and the organisation had started services for adults, SARC changed their name to the Movement for the Intellectually Disabled of Singapore (MINDS) in 1985. In 1987, the organisation benefitted by being primarily funded from The Community Chest of Singapore, and in 1993 MINDS became the largest voluntary welfare organisation in Singapore, with AESN in second place. Relocation of the MINDS special schools, from premises of closed-down primary schools to new buildings with customised facilities, began in 1998. The association started their first social enterprise, a car washing service along Pasir Panjang Road, in 2001. Their residential homes and training centres were merged into the MINDSville@Napiri centre, which opened in 2007, and the relocation programme was completed two years later.

They run four special schools and a centre called MINDSville@Napiri which offers therapy and residential care. Other MINDS services include sheltered workshops, social enterprises, and day activity centre.  MINDS generates yearly expenses of 21 million Singapore dollars, as of 2005. In 2022, MINDS opened the Minds Hub (Central) on Queens Road to provide a variety of services.

Activities 
MINDS runs four special schools for intellectually disabled students aged 4 to 18, who are taught various life skills, such as personal grooming and money management. They are also taken on outings to learn how to handle common tasks, such as buying groceries and taking public transport. Students undergo physiotherapy, pre-vocational training, as well as basic instruction in some mainstream academic subjects, including languages, mathematics, art, and science. To help the intellectually disabled gain employment, MINDS trains them for simple sorting and packing jobs at sheltered workshops, then negotiates contracts with potential employers: for example, some were hired by Singapore Airlines to recycle headsets. The organisation also manages several social enterprises, including a thrift shop, a car washing service, a food catering company, and a performing arts troupe, that increase employment opportunities for the intellectually disabled.

Under the MINDS Trusteeship Scheme, parents of the intellectually disabled can deposit their savings into a trust account, safeguarded by the public trustee, and after they die, MINDS ensures the money is used to fund caregiving of the beneficiary. Other MINDS services, including counselling, behaviour therapy and rehabilitation, are concentrated at their integrated service centre called MINDSville@Napiri. The centre contains a nursing home for adults with high support needs, another home for intellectually disabled children from broken families, and a hostel, which provides flexible accommodation options for clients who need less-intensive care. In addition, volunteers from the MINDS Youth Group conduct weekly educational, social, and recreational activities, such as swimming classes and singing sessions, for around 170 intellectually disabled people.

Awards 
MINDS has won several awards, including the 2001 President's Social Service Award  from the National Council of Social Service and the 2010 Singapore Health Award (Gold) by the Health Promotion Board.

Management
The organisation is headed by Chairman Augustin Lee and Chief Executive Officer Kelvin Koh, who lead a 15-member executive committee with 10 subcommittees that meet monthly to discuss problems and plan new programmes.

To support events and advocate for the inclusion of People with Intellectual Disability (PWIDs), MINDS is supported by over 4000 volunteers, including corporate and non-corporate members.

References

External links
MINDS official website

Disability organisations based in Singapore
Singaporean voluntary welfare organisations